Michèle Bonneton (born 15 July 1947 in Tullins) was a deputy in the 14th legislature of the French Fifth Republic for Isère's 9th constituency from 2012 to 2017 as a member of Europe Ecology and with the support of the Socialist Party.

She was an associate professor of Physical Sciences and an organic walnut grower. She was a municipal councilor for 13 years. In the 2012 election she won against the UMP candidate in the 2nd round with 53.93% of the vote (27,187 votes). She did not run in the legislative elections of 2017, but was the substitute for Patrick Cholat (EELV).

References

External links
 Her page on the site of the National Assembly
 

1947 births
Living people
Deputies of the 14th National Assembly of the French Fifth Republic
People from Isère
Politicians from Auvergne-Rhône-Alpes
Women members of the National Assembly (France)
21st-century French women